Lehenweiler is a hamlet in the municipality of Aidlingen, in the Landkreis (district) of Böblingen, in Baden-Württemberg, Germany. It lies in the landscape region called the Heckengäu.

History
In 1709, Eberhard Louis, Duke of Württemberg granted three favoured knights each 15 morgen - about  - of land from the fiefdom ("Lehen") of Aidlingen. The second part of the name is "Weiler", which means "hamlet".

Amenities
In the middle of the village is the old school, built in 1813, which is now used as a community centre.

References

Populated places in Baden-Württemberg
Böblingen (district)